The Liberty Bridge is a pedestrian bridge in Greenville, South Carolina. It is located at Falls Park on the Reedy, where it crosses the Reedy River above the Reedy River Falls.

Description
Downtown Greenville is bisected by a wooded valley park containing the falls of the Reedy River. The Liberty Bridge is located just downstream from this group of waterfalls, replacing a six-lane highway bridge that was demolished to improve the visibility and accessibility to the falls and adjacent park. The bridge has a curved clear span over the river that curves away from the falls, providing visitors with an aerial amphitheater from which to view the cascading water. The link gently slopes into the ravine and is supported by twin inclined towers and a single suspension cable with thin cable suspenders only on the side away from the falls, allowing for unobstructed views. The twin towers and suspension cable are visible from vantage points around the city, calling attention and drawing visitors to the public park, falls and river.

Design and construction
The Liberty Bridge was completed in 2004, with Miguel Rosales of Boston-based transportation architects Rosales + Partners providing conceptual, preliminary, and final designs, construction services, and community participation to the City of Greenville. Rosales + Partners collaborated with structural engineers Schlaich Bergermann & Partner and Arbor Engineering.

References

External links
 Falls Park official website
 Liberty Bridge engineering details
 
 Miguel Rosales, Liberty Bridge Architect
 Celebrating the 10th anniversary of Falls Park, the “crown jewel” that helped bring the green back to downtown Greenville
 Liberty Bridge, Falls Park transformed downtown
 City to Celebrate 10th Anniversary of Falls Park
 Liberty Bridge a ‘transformative work of art’
 Falls Park and Liberty Bridge Reclaiming Greenville's Natural Beauty

Buildings and structures in Greenville, South Carolina
Bridges in South Carolina
Suspension bridges in the United States
Pedestrian bridges in the United States
Bridges completed in 2004
Transportation in Greenville, South Carolina
Towers in South Carolina
Steel bridges in the United States